Acanthodoris caerulescens is a species of sea slug, a dorid nudibranch, a shell-less marine gastropod mollusc in the family Onchidorididae.

This is a taxon inquirendum.

Distribution 
This species was described from the north end of Nunivak Island, Alaska. It has not been reported since the original description.

References

Onchidorididae
Gastropods described in 1880